District of Columbia International School (DCI) is a public charter school in Washington, DC. It offers an International Baccalaureate education to students in grades 6 to 12. Each student learns in a partial language immersion program in Spanish, French or Chinese

It is overseen by the District of Columbia Public Charter School Board.

History and campus
DCI was founded in 2014 to provide a secondary school with advanced foreign language classes to students from language immersion public charter elementary schools. While admission is lottery-based, Latin American Montessori Bilingual Public Charter School, Washington Yu Ying Public Charter School, Elsie Whitlow Stokes Community Freedom Public Charter School, Mundo Verde Public Charter School, and DC Bilingual Public Charter School graduates are given preference in the lottery for 6th grade.

In 2017, the school moved into its permanent campus, the Delano Hall building of the former Walter Reed Army Medical Center. The new building can accommodate up to 1,450 students.

Student body
DCI is a diverse school with no majority race, consisting of about 40% African-American, 40% Hispanic, and 15% Caucasian students in the 2018-19 school year. 8.3% are English language learners and 51.6% are economically disadvantaged.

Academic program
Students in grades 6-10 follow the International Baccalaureate Middle Years Program and students in grades 11-12 can either study for the International Baccalaureate Diploma or International Baccalaureate Career-related Program. All students choose to focus on Chinese, French, or Spanish, and can pursue the IB Bilingual Diploma.

Results
In 2019, the DCI middle and high school were both rated Tier 1 by the District of Columbia Public Charter School Board. The same year, 61% of DCI students achieved proficiency in the English Language Arts/Literacy section of the PARCC exam and 41% achieved proficiency in the math section.

References

External links 
 

Brightwood (Washington, D.C.)
Charter schools in the District of Columbia
Educational institutions established in 2014
Public high schools in Washington, D.C.
Public middle schools in Washington, D.C.
International schools in the United States
International Baccalaureate schools in Washington, D.C.
2014 establishments in Washington, D.C.